'Into Colour' is the third album by the British singer-songwriter Rumer. It was released on 10 November 2014.

Singles
 "Dangerous" was the first single released from the album.
 Billboard premiered "Reach Out" in the United States via streaming on 23 January 2015.

Track listing

Charts

Release history

References

2014 albums
Rumer (musician) albums
Atlantic Records albums